Hard to Hold is the eighth studio album by Rick Springfield released on July 23, 1984, by RCA Records as the soundtrack to the film of the same name. The album includes the U.S. Top 5 hit "Love Somebody", Top 40 hits "Don't Walk Away" and "Bop 'Til You Drop", plus minor hit "Taxi Dancing" (a duet with Randy Crawford). In addition to Springfield appearing on the soundtrack, there are three tracks from other artists; "When The Lights Go Down" by Graham Parker, "Heart Of A Woman" by Nona Hendryx, and a live version of "I Go Swimming" by Peter Gabriel. The album was later remastered by Steve Hoffman for the Razor and Tie reissue label.

Reception
From contemporary reviews, Ken Tucker of The Philadelphia Inquirer gave the album three out of five star rating, noting that "Love Somebody" was Springfrield's "best pop-rocker since "Jessie's Girl" and the filler songs on the album include good songs by Graham Parker and Peter Gabriel. Tucker concluded that the album was "one of the few soundtrack albums that doesn't cheat its listeners."

Cash Box said that the second single "Don't Walk Away" has "a more heavy metal tinge...than on 'Love Somebody' and Springfield’s hard rock sensibilities come into full flower with a high-energy sound that gives this tune a forceful momentum."

Cash Box called the third single "Bob 'Til You Drop" "an urban mover for the ’80s."

Track listing

Personnel
Producers: Rick Springfield & Bill Drescher
Engineer: Bill Drescher
Second Engineers: Eddie Delena, Rick Polakow
Executive Producer: D. Constantine Conte
Mastered by Greg Fulginiti at Artisan Sound Recorders, Hollywood
CD Mastered by Steve Hoffman
Recorded by [Pre-production Assistance]: Jeff Silverman 
Brett Tuggle, Richard Page, Rick Springfield, Jerry Marotta [PG], Tom Kelly - backing vocals
Mike Seifrit, Reggie McBride, Tony Levin [PG] - bass
Peter Gabriel [PG] - vocals
Mike Baird - drums
Jeff Silverman, Rick Springfield, David Rhoades [PG], Tim Pierce - guitar
Alan Pasqua, John Philip Shenale, Mitchell Froom, Larry Fast [PG], Rick Springfield - keyboards
Michael Fisher - acoustic percussion
Reek Havoc, Rick Springfield - electronic percussion
Joel Peskin - saxophone, electric woodwind
[PG] Peter Gabriel track (I Go Swimming)

Charts

Certifications

References

Rick Springfield albums
1984 soundtrack albums
1980s film soundtrack albums
RCA Records soundtracks